Adam John Parker (born January 13, 1972) is an American prelate of the Roman Catholic Church. He has been an auxiliary bishop for the Archdiocese of Baltimore in Maryland since 2016.  Parker has also served as vicar general and moderator of the curia.

Biography

Early life and education 
Adam Parker was born on January 13, 1972, in Cleveland, Ohio. He was the son of George and Maureen Parker. He grew up in Severna Park, Maryland, and was educated at Severna Park High School. Parker studied at Virginia Tech in Blacksburg, Virginia, and the University of Maryland, College Park in College Park, Maryland, graduating with a Bachelor of Arts degree in communications.

Parker undertook formation for the priesthood at St. Mary's Seminary and University in Baltimore, Maryland.  He then attended the Pontifical North American College and Pontifical Gregorian University, both in Rome.

Priesthood 
On May 27, 2000, Parker was ordained to the priesthood for the Archdiocese of Baltimore by Cardinal William H. Keeler. After his ordination, Parker served as associate pastor of St. Peter Parish in Westernport, Maryland, and St. Michael Parish in Frostburg, Maryland, from 2001 to 2005. He was administrator of Ascension Parish in Halethorpe, Maryland, from 2005 to 2006, and pastor there from 2006 to 2007. He served simultaneously as associate director of the Permanent Diaconate Formation Team for the archdiocese from 2006 to 2007.

Parker was appointed by the outgoing archbishop of Baltimore, Cardinal Keeler, in 2007 to serve as priest secretary for the incoming archbishop, Bishop Edwin O'Brien. When O'Brien was named grand master of the Order of the Holy Sepulchre and a cardinal in 2012, Parker relocated with O'Brien to Rome. In September 2011, Parker was made a monsignor by Pope Benedict XVI. In 2013, Parker returned to Baltimore as archdiocesan vice chancellor under Archbishop William E. Lori, and in July 2014 became vicar general and moderator of the curia, with responsibility for managing the central services of the archdiocese.

Auxiliary Bishop of Baltimore 
On December 5, 2016, Pope Francis appointed Parker as an auxiliary bishop for the Archdiocese of Baltimore.  Parker was also appointed titular bishop of Tasaccora. He was consecrated in the Cathedral of Mary Our Queen in Baltimore on January 19, 2017, by Archbishop Lori.

See also

 Catholic Church hierarchy
 Catholic Church in the United States
 Historical list of the Catholic bishops of the United States
 List of Catholic bishops of the United States
 Lists of patriarchs, archbishops, and bishops

References

External links
Roman Catholic Archdiocese of Baltimore

1947 births
Living people
Religious leaders from Cleveland
Virginia Tech alumni
University of Maryland, College Park alumni
21st-century Roman Catholic bishops in the United States
Bishops appointed by Pope Francis